Jodis putata is a moth of the family Geometridae. It is found in parts of Europe.

The length of the forewings is 10–12 mm. The adults fly from late April to mid July  in one generation.

The green colour of the imago gradually disappears during the flight season, rendering the moth pale white. The moth is active during the day.

The flight season refers to the Netherlands and Belgium. This may vary in other parts of the range.

External links

Fauna Europaea
Lepiforum.de
Vlindernet.nl 

Hemitheini
Moths of Japan
Moths of Europe
Taxa named by Carl Linnaeus
Moths described in 1758